Whispering Hills is a summer village in Alberta, Canada. It is located on the eastern shore of Baptiste Lake.

Demographics 

In the 2016 Census of Population conducted by Statistics Canada, the Summer Village of Whispering Hills had a population of 142 living in 62 of its 136 total private dwellings, a  change from its 2011 population of 108.

See also 
List of communities in Alberta
List of summer villages in Alberta
List of resort villages in Saskatchewan

References

External links 

1983 establishments in Alberta
Summer villages in Alberta